Stian Andre Ebbesvik Eisenträger (born 1984) is a Norwegian journalist and the current editor-in-chief of Forsvarets forum, an independently edited magazine published by the Norwegian Armed Forces that covers the armed forces as well as defense and security policy. Eisenträger worked as a foreign affairs journalist at Verdens Gang from 2007 to 2020, and was the newspaper's acting head of foreign news. In 2020 he became the editor-in-chief of Forsvarets forum. He also worked as a journalist at Forsvarets forum from 2003 to 2004, when serving his conscription service in the Norwegian military. In 2018 he was one of the recipients of the Internasjonal Reporter Prize at SKUP, for the article series "Det hvite raseriet."

References

1984 births
Living people
Norwegian journalists
Verdens Gang people